The Girls of Canby Hall Series by Emily Chase, published by Scholastic (1984–1989), is a collection of young adult novels, based around the lives of a group of students at a New England boarding School.

Emily Chase, the "official author" is not really one writer, are many authors who have alternated themselves to write books (one of most famous is the romantic author Julie Garwood).

Plot summary

The story began with three teen-age girls coming to Canby Hall, a prestigious boarding school in Greenleaf, Massachusetts. Canby Hall was named after Julia Canby, the daughter of a Boston businessman who had died of Scarlet Fever while abroad in Europe.  Shelley Hyde, from Iowa; Faith Thompson from Washington, D.C. and Dana Morrison from New York City. They were assigned to 407 Baker Hall. (The other two dorm halls were Addison and Charles houses) At first the three girls clashed due to their differences, (Dana and Faith, both being from the East Coast, bonded immediately and Shelley having a harder time of it due to her being from the Midwest) but their young and hip housemother, Alison Cavanaugh, helped them sort through their differences and they bonded and became best friends.  Their friendship was even more solidified when, during a trip to see Shelley's family and friends in Iowa, Faith had a terrible medical emergency, which scared everyone involved.

After Shelley, Dana and Faith graduated, three new girls (Andrea "Andy" Cord; Jane Barrett and October "Toby" Houston) moved into 407, and on occasion, the six girls would get together, mainly for their former housemother's wedding and her pregnancy.  Jane's family (the Barretts) had helped give the money to build the school's science hall named Barrett Hall.  After Alison's marriage and her move to Boston, a new housemother named Meredith Pembroke comes along, and at first, handed out demerits with reckless abandon because she was overreacting to her own wild adolescence. Andrea, Jane and Toby talked her through the rough time, and then Meredith (nicknamed, Merrie) became as nice and friendly as Alison had been.

The other main adult, aside from the housemothers, was the school's austere headmistress, Patrice Allardyce, who was known as P.A. behind her back.  Despite her austerity and her enforcement of the rules, Ms. Allardyce was also discovered to be a fair, compassionate and personable human being too.

The Girls of Canby Hall Series

List of books
Roommates, 1984
Our Roommate is Missing, 1984
You're No Friend of Mine, 1984
Keeping Secrets, 1984
Summer Blues, 1984
Best Friends Forever, 1984
Four Is a Crowd, 1984
The Big Crush, 1984
Boy Trouble, 1984
Make Me a Star, 1985
With Friends Like That, 1985
Who's the New Girl?, 1985
Here Come the Boys, 1985
What's a Girl To Do?, 1985  (by Julie Garwood)
To Tell the Truth, 1985
Three of a Kind, 1985
Graduation Day, 1986
Making Friends, 1986
One Boy Too Many, 1986
Friends Times Three, 1987
Party Time!, 1987
Troublemaker, 1987
But She's So Cute, 1987
Princess Who?, 1987
The Ghost of Canby Hall, 1987
Help Wanted!, 1988
The Roommate and the Cowboy, 1988
Happy Birthday, Jane, 1988
A Roommate Returns, 1988
Surprise!, 1988
Here Comes the Bridesmaid, 1988
Who's Got a Crush on Andy?, 1989
Six Roommates and a Baby, 1989

Super Editions (Related titles)
Something Old, Something New, 1986
The Almost Summer Carnival, 1987

References and resources
Scholastic Website

External links
Girls of Canby Hall Series by Emily Chase 1984 to 1989 in eBay
Emily Chase in FictionDB

Series of books
Juvenile series